Windsor & Eton railway station may refer to:

 Windsor & Eton Central railway station
 Windsor & Eton Riverside railway station